Daniel McLaren (1870–unknown) was a Scottish footballer who played in the Football League for Stoke.

Career
McLaren was born in Lochee and played football with the local side before moving south to Royal Arsenal in 1891. He joined Stoke in 1892–93 and played mainly for the reserve side in The Combination. McLaren made one appearance in the Football League which came in a 3–2 defeat at Burnley on 24 September 1892, taking the place of the injured Wilmot Turner.

Career statistics

References

1870 births
Scottish footballers
Stoke City F.C. players
English Football League players
Association football forwards
Year of death missing